Adrian Matthew Burk (December 14, 1927 – July 28, 2003) was an American football quarterback in the National Football League (NFL) for the Baltimore Colts and Philadelphia Eagles. After his playing career, he served as an official.

Playing career
Burk played college football at Baylor University and was drafted in the first round of the 1950 NFL Draft.  Burk is one of eight NFL quarterbacks (Sid Luckman, George Blanda, Joe Kapp, Y. A. Tittle, Peyton Manning, Nick Foles, and Drew Brees) who share the record of seven touchdown passes in one regular season game.  He threw seven touchdown passes on October 17, 1954, when the Eagles won 49–21 over the Washington Redskins.  Three of his touchdown passes were to Eagles end Pete Pihos.

Burk graduated from Baylor Law School and became general counsel to the Houston Oilers.

Officiating career
Burk later worked as an NFL official as a back judge (now field judge), wearing uniform number 63.  He worked the game that saw Joe Kapp of the Minnesota Vikings tie his record for seven touchdown passes in one game in 1969 vs. the Baltimore Colts. Burk was also the back judge in the famous 1972 playoff game between the Oakland Raiders and the Pittsburgh Steelers. That game, played in Pittsburgh, featured the play that came to be called the "Immaculate Reception". From his position as back judge, Burk was the first of the officials to signal a touchdown.

During a 1973 game between the Chicago Bears and Denver Broncos, Bears coach Abe Gibron can be heard chewing out Burk throughout the contest. Gibron was miked for the game by NFL Films, and the footage was released by NFL Films Executive Director Steve Sabol in 2001.

References

1927 births
2003 deaths
American football quarterbacks
Baltimore Colts (1947–1950) players
Baylor Bears football players
Houston Oilers executives
Kilgore Rangers football players
National Football League officials
Philadelphia Eagles players
Eastern Conference Pro Bowl players
Baylor Law School alumni
People from Limestone County, Texas
Players of American football from Texas